Elizabeth "Zibby" Owens (née Schwarzman), is an American writer and podcast host based in New York City. Her podcast is called Moms Don’t Have Time to Read Books.

Life and career
Zibby Owens, born Elizabeth Schwarzman to billionaire Stephen A. Schwarzman, a co-founder, chairman and CEO of The Blackstone Group, and Ellen Katz (née Philips), a trustee of Northwestern University and the Mount Sinai Medical Center  Her family is Jewish.  She grew up on the Upper East Side of Manhattan. Her brother is film producer Teddy Schwarzman. She attended Yale and Harvard Business School.

Owens started the Moms Don’t Have Time to Read Books podcast in which she interviews authors in spring 2018. By December 2019, she had made 200 Moms Don’t Have Time to Read Books podcast episodes which had been downloaded a quarter of a million times.

In the spring of 2020, Owens interviewed authors on Instagram and launched an online literary magazine called We Found Time featuring essays written by authors who had been on her podcast. A book called Moms Don't Have Time To: A Quarantine Anthology based on those essays was released in February 2021.

Owens is a member of New York Public Library's advisory council.

Publications
What to Wear to Show Off Your Assets. What to Do to Tone Up Your Trouble Spots, (as Zibby Right), co-authored with Paige Adams-Geller, and Ashley Borden; McGraw-Hill (January 2008)
Moms Don't Have Time To: A Quarantine Anthology (2021)
Moms Don't Have Time To Have Kids: A Timeless Anthology (2021)

Personal life
Owens is married to Kyle Owens, a former tennis pro and a film producer.  Her first marriage to Andrew Right ended in divorce.

References

External links
Official website

Living people
American writers
American podcasters
Jewish American writers
Yale University alumni
Harvard Business School alumni
Year of birth missing (living people)
People from Manhattan